Avignon Provence Airport is an airport located in the city of Avignon and  west of Caumont-sur-Durance, in the Vaucluse department of the Provence-Alpes-Côte d'Azur region in France.

Facilities 
It has one paved runway designated 17/35 which measures . The shorter grass runway is for use by ultralight aircraft.

Airline and destination 

The following airlines operate regular scheduled and charter flights to and from Avignon:

The nearest major international airport is Marseille Provence Airport approx. 80 km to the southeast.

Statistics

References

External links 

 Aéroport d'Avignon-Provence (official site) 
 Caravelle Guyane (official site) 
 Aéroport d'Avignon (Union des Aéroports Français) 
 
 
 

Airports in Provence-Alpes-Côte d'Azur
Vaucluse
Airports established in 1937